Lake Carhuacocha (possibly from Quechua qarwa leaf worm, larva of a beetle; pale, yellowish, golden, qucha lake,) is a lake in Peru located in the Huanuco Region, Lauricocha Province, on the border of the districts of Jesús and Queropalca. It lies on the east side of the Huayhuash mountain range. The lake is about 1.5 km long and 0.44 km at its widest point.

See also

List of lakes in Peru

References

Lakes of Peru
Lakes of Huánuco Region